Leslie Wichbold Wade (April 8, 1909 – May 5, 1980) was a Canadian middle-distance runner. He competed in the men's 1500 metres at the 1932 Summer Olympics. He died in Ithaca, New York in 1971, aged 71.

References

1909 births
1980 deaths
Athletes (track and field) at the 1932 Summer Olympics
Canadian male middle-distance runners
Olympic track and field athletes of Canada
Athletes (track and field) at the 1934 British Empire Games
Commonwealth Games competitors for Canada
Anglophone Quebec people
Athletes from Montreal